The 2008 Northern Iowa Panthers football team represented the University of Northern Iowa in the 2008 NCAA Division I FCS football season. The previous year's team finished first (of nine) in the Gateway Football Conference. The Gateway Football Conference was renamed the Missouri Valley Football League in June 2008. The team was coached by Mark Farley and played their home games in the UNI-Dome. On November 14, Northern Iowa won its first back-to-back conference championships since the 1995 and 1996 seasons.  Northern Iowa was awarded the third seed in the 2008 FCS playoffs.

Schedule

Coaching staff

Rankings

References

Northern Iowa
Northern Iowa Panthers football seasons
Missouri Valley Football Conference champion seasons
Northern Iowa Panthers football